Athletics has featured as a sport at the Youth Olympic Summer Games since its first edition in 2010. The Youth Olympic Games are multi-sport event and the games are held every four years just like the Olympic Games. Athletes under the age of 18 can participate in the Games. This age group corresponds with the youth category of athletics competition.

Summary

Medal table
As of the 2018 Summer Youth Olympics.

Events

Youth Olympic Games Records

Boys

Girls

References

External links

Youth Olympic Games at iaaf.com
Youth Olympic Games

 
Sports at the Summer Youth Olympics
Youth Olympic Games
Olympic Games